Fulvimonas soli is a motile bacterium from the genus of Fulvimonas which has been isolated from soil from Ghent in Belgium.

References

Xanthomonadales
Bacteria described in 2002